General Hospital Psychiatry is a bimonthly peer-reviewed medical journal covering psychiatry. It was established in 1979 and is published by Elsevier. The editor-in-chief is Jeffrey C. Huffman (Massachusetts General Hospital). According to the Journal Citation Reports, the journal has a 2018 impact factor of 3.220.

References

External links

Psychiatry journals
Publications established in 1979
Elsevier academic journals
Bimonthly journals
English-language journals